Alocasia robusta is a gigantic herb of the aroid family (Araceae) which is endemic to the island of Borneo. More recently, Anthony Lamb of the Sabah Agricultural Department found and measured one individual with a lamina  in length. The inflorescence is the spathe and spadix typical of the Arum family, with the spathe being a very dark  blackish-purple color. This species was unknown to science prior to 1967. The plant is usually trunkless.

References

robusta